Anbu Thangai is a 1974 Indian Tamil-language film, directed by S. P. Muthuraman, starring Muthuraman and Jayalalithaa. Jaya appears as Muthuraman's sister and Jayalalithaa as his love interest. Srikanth played an important role as Muthuraman's friend. Kamal Haasan plays a guest role in the film as Buddha in a dance sequence with Jayalalithaa. The film was remake of Chelleli Kapuram.

Kamal Haasan choreographed a song for Jayalalithaa and himself in the film.

Plot

Cast 
R. Muthuraman
Jayalalithaa
Major Sundarrajan
S. V. Ramadas
Srikanth
Jaya
K. A. Thangavelu
Suruli Rajan
Sachu
A. Sakunthala
Oru Viral Krishna Rao
Usilai Mani
Kamal Haasan as Buddha (Guest appearance)

Soundtrack 
The music was composed by K. V. Mahadevan.

References

External links 
 

1970s Tamil-language films
1974 films
Films directed by S. P. Muthuraman
Films scored by K. V. Mahadevan
Indian black-and-white films
Tamil remakes of Telugu films